GoDaddy Inc. is an American publicly traded Internet domain registrar and web hosting company headquartered in Tempe, Arizona and incorporated in Delaware.

Acquisitions

See also 
 List of largest mergers and acquisitions

References

External links 

 Official website

GoDaddy
GoDaddy
GoDaddy
Mergers